The 1980 United States presidential election in Wisconsin took place on November 4, 1980. All 50 states and The District of Columbia, were part of the 1980 United States presidential election. State voters chose eight electors to the Electoral College, who voted for president and vice president.

In the earliest polls in August, Reagan was well ahead of Carter. Independent candidate John B. Anderson, who had recently chosen former Badger State Governor Patrick Lucey as his running mate, was ahead of Carter in some normally Democratic districts of the state. Anderson was the first of the three leading candidates to campaign in the state, doing so alongside his running mate early in September, Reagan campaigned in the state during the first week of October, when he was ahead by 5 points in a recent poll, and argued that his tax cuts are necessary to aid business and an economy affected by stagflation. Carter would not campaign in Wisconsin until the second week of October, when he argued against Reagan’s nuclear and military arms positions, arguing that they could lead to interventions that were “jingoistic”, “macho” and “guided by a desire to push everybody around”.

In October, Reagan continued to lead in Wisconsin, although his lead fell as Anderson’s strength dropped below the 20 percent level where it had been during September. Wisconsin was ultimately won by Reagan and running mate and former C.I.A. Director George H. W. Bush of Texas against incumbent President Carter by 4.72 points, about what had been expected at the beginning of October. This result made Wisconsin almost 5% more Democratic than the nation-at-large.

Primaries

Democratic primary

Republican primary

Results

Results by county

See also
 United States presidential elections in Wisconsin

Notes

References

Wisconsin
1980
1980 Wisconsin elections